The Men's sprint competition at the 2017 FIL World Luge Championships was held on 27 January 2017.

A qualification was held to determine the 15 participants.

Results
The final was started at 15:16.

References

Men's sprint